The Ministry of Internal Affairs of Dagestan (Министерства внутренних дел Республики Дагестан) is the interior ministry of Dagestan in southern Russia. The Ministry is headquartered in Makhachkala. As of 2012 the minister was Abdurashid Magomedov.

History 

The Russian Ministry of Internal Affairs was founded on September 8, 1822.  It was founded as part of a government reform.  The first minister was Count Kochubey.

An especially important milestone in the construction of the Russian Interior Ministry was in 1880, when the Emperor Alexander II carried reorganized the agency, which later took a leading position in the state. Its head was almost the first minister of the Empire.

After the October Revolution, the Ministry became the People's Commissariat of Internal Affairs, which laid the foundation for the pre-revolutionary structure of the MVD. The establishment of Soviet rule in the republic began a new phase of law enforcement agencies, including police (then-called Militsiya).

On 21 April 1920, the Dagestan Revolutionary Committee appointed Karim Mamedbekova as military commissioner and the Chief of Police. He was commissioned to prepare a draft of militia organization.

On 28 April 1920 in Timir-Khan-Shura a committee chaired by D. Korkmasova adopted a resolution "to protect the revolutionary order and public security police." On 13 May the resolution was approved by the supreme authority of the police.

With the formation of the Dagestan Autonomous Soviet Socialist Republic, in February 1921 the Regional police department was renamed the General Directorate of Dagestan. Red Army units eliminated almost all of the remaining gangs by the end of 1925.

The Soviet police was established on the third day after the October Revolution – November 10, 1917, as a body of revolutionary order. During the first months of Soviet power the workers' militia formed on a voluntary basis. They served both as an armed force and an organ of public order. On 10 May 1918 the NKVD decided: "The police are there as a permanent staff of the persons executing special functions, the organization of the militia should be carried out irrespective of the organization of the Red Army, their functions must be strictly separated."

The formation of the Internal Security bodies of the Russian Socialist Republic was completed in May 1922. The "Regulations on the People's Commissariat of Internal Affairs of the Soviet Russia" defined the structure of the Commissariat and other law-enforcement bodies along with their rights and responsibilities.

In 1946, commissariats were replaced by formalized ministries, including the Ministry of Internal Affairs, which took final shape in 1968 as the All-Union Ministry. It was then that the police received its present characteristics and structure. Significant progress was made in countering street crime and engaging citizens in maintaining order and security. This was facilitated by close interaction with local government and governance.

In 1954 the NKVD was split into the separate KGB and Interior Ministry. The reorganization took place more than once: before and during World War II and the postwar years.

The "Perestroika" period led to major changes in internal affairs bodies. The advent of sovereignty of the form Soviet republics changed their legal status.

In October 1989, the Ministry of Internal Affairs of the Russian Federation emerged. In December, the Council of Ministers approved its new structure.

The time since the Soviet collapse, revealed new challenges in the form of rapid growth of crime, which was a reflection of the dysfunctional state and social establishment. Sociopolitical tensions, ethnic conflicts, economic deterioration, and most importantly, the professionalism and intellectualization of crime, armed with the latest technologies.

The Interior Ministry could not always give an adequate response. Today the Interior Ministry emphasizes simple principles: efficiency, structural clarity, proportionality challenges, technological equipment and personnel.

Post-Soviet law enforcement replaced Marx' "dictatorship of the proletariat" with the dictatorship of the law. The success of this activity is largely determined by the quality of personnel, professional capacity and the moral and psychological readiness to perform assigned tasks.

The patriotic and moral qualities of the police officers were severely tested during the anti-terror operation in the North Caucasus and in the fight against extremism and terrorism, signaled by the attacks in Makhachkala, the Caspian, Buinaksk and in several other Russian cities, and finally the tragedy of the Moscow theater hostage crisis in 2004.

The situation in Chechnya deteriorated to such an extent that its territory became a springboard for terrorism in Russia. Only a counter-terror operation in Dagestan was able to avert the threat of disintegration of Russia. President Vladimir Putin said: "Dagestan is saving Russia from collapse."

The history of the Russian Interior Ministry is closely connected with Dagestan. The Ministry adopted techniques employed by the military governor of the Dagestan region. Lieutenant general Prince Chavchavadze Baryatinsky, Volsky, Tikhonov, Major-General Alftan, Ermolov, Colonel Dingizov-Jansen and others over the years maintained law and order in Dagestan.

See also
Adilgerei Magomedtagirov

External links
Official homepage

Politics of Dagestan
Dagestan
Dagestan